Mary Berger may refer to:

Mary Odilia Berger (1823–1880), German-American religious leader, founded Sisters of St. Mary
Mary Berger (speed skater) (born 1946), American speed skater